STIWOT ("Stichting Informatie Wereldoorlog Twee") is a Dutch non-profit organization founded in 2002 to disseminate information about the Second World War, based on the website Go2War2.nl, established in 1999 by Frank van der Drift. It does this mainly through the Internet. The foundation maintains several multi-lingual online projects that deal with the history of the Second World War. Both professional historians and hobbyists are encouraged to provide additional information or images.

Work
STIWOT translated the Nuremberg trials documents to Dutch. It also published the list of names of the victims of the Operation Silbertanne.

Projects

TracesofWar

References

External links 

Netherlands in World War II
Nuremberg trials
Aftermath of World War II in the Netherlands
Non-profit organisations based in the Netherlands